The South African Military Academy is based on similar principles to that of the military academy system of the United States (United States Military Academy United States Naval Academy United States Air Force Academy). The academy is a military unit of the South African National Defence Force (SANDF) housing the Faculty of Military Science of the University of Stellenbosch. It provides officers of all the arms of service an opportunity to earn a BMil or more advanced degrees.
See .

History
The academy was established on 1 April 1950 under the auspices of the University of Pretoria and the South African Military College (now the South African Army College) in Voortrekkerhoogte (now Thaba Tswane), with the goal of elevating students to a BA (Mil) or BSc (Mil) degree to meet the intellectual challenges of modern war.

In 1954 the newly elected National Party Minister of Defence, Frans Erasmus, wanting to establish the military academy as a separate, independent, all-service institution decided to relocate the academy to Saldanha, his political constituency. In Pretoria it had catered for army and air force students only. The military academy was organisationally divorced from the South African Army College on 1 February 1956. Its headquarters temporarily shifted to Stellenbosch, while suitable accommodation was built at Saldanha starting in 1956. The headquarters of the military academy moved to Saldanha in December 1957 and in February 1958 the first students, second and third-years, reported at Saldanha. It became the Faculty of Military Science of the University of Stellenbosch in 1961, who now awarded a B Mil degree to successful students.

The South African Defence Force's increasing involvement in the Border War from the mid-1970s produced an increased demand for junior officers, with the result that the Defence Force decided that junior officers should be "task qualified" within their respective services before becoming eligible for admission to the military academy. The degree course at the military academy was thus excluded from the development cycle of junior officers from 1976; admittance to the academy then became an option for those who wished to obtain a university degree.

Organization and administration

Faculty
There are 48 members of the Faculty of Military Science who form an integrated group of military and civilian lecturers. 
Brig Gen A.J. De Castro is the commandant of the military academy, and the dean of the faculty is Samuel Tshehla.

Campus
It is situated on the West Coast in the town of Saldanha, set against the scenic slopes of Malgaskop, overlooking Saldanha Bay.

Academics

Programs
A three-year bachelor's degree in military science (B. Mil) is awarded to students upon graduation in December. The B. Mil is the generic title for the degree which may be undertaken in two different fields, these being natural science (equivalent to Bsc) and social sciences (equivalent to BA). Traditionally, natural science has been considered the premiere degree due to its highly quantitative nature of its course contents (i.e. mathematics, physics). After graduation, they rejoin their arm of service to serve as officers. Postgraduate qualifications at master's and doctoral level are also offered.  After the launch of the PhD programme at the Faculty Military Science, two of the first graduates of this programme were Dr Evert Kleyhans and Capt (SAN) Dr A.P. Putter - both graduating with PhDs in Military Science (December 2018).  Both Dr Kleynhans (specializing in Military History) and Capt (SAN) Dr Dries Putter (specializing in Counterintelligence) are now lecturers at the FMS.

Students
About 300 men and women represent the four arms of service.

Commandants
Until 1967 the dean of the faculty also served as commanding officer of the academy. In 1967 these roles were split, allowing a professional lecturer to act as dean and a military officer to act as commanding officer.

Annual awards

Sword of Honour 
Citation for awards over period 1953-2008

Best Student – Army 
Citation for awards over period 1957-2008

Best Student – Airforce 
Citation for awards over period 1957-2005

Best Student – Navy 
Citation for awards over period 1957-2008

See also
Military history of South Africa

References

Universities in the Western Cape
Stellenbosch University
Military education and training in South Africa
Educational institutions established in 1950
1950 establishments in South Africa
Military academies